Jes Macallan is an American actress. She is best known for her roles as Josslyn Carver in ABC drama series Mistresses and Ava Sharpe in The CW superhero comedy-drama Legends of Tomorrow.

Early life
Macallan trained in dance in her youth and participated in classes with choreographers including Mia Michaels.

She earned a bachelor's degree in business administration from the University of Florida, and studied abroad for a term at Bocconi University in Milan, Italy. She modeled during college. After graduation, she studied acting in Los Angeles and New York.

Career
Macallan is an actor and director. From 2013 to 2016, she starred in ABC's drama series, Mistresses. She starred in The CW's Legends of Tomorrow from 2017 to 2022. She directed two episodes of Legends of Tomorrow, as well as episodes of All Rise and All American.

In 2016, Macallan wrote, produced, and directed the short film Self, E. She submitted the film as part of her application to the Warner Bros. television directors workshop. She was accepted into the workshop and graduated in 2019.

Filmography

Film

Television

References

External links

 
 

1982 births
Actresses from Florida
American television actresses
American people of Italian descent
Living people
People from Sarasota, Florida
University of Florida alumni
21st-century American actresses